Bases Loaded II: Second Season, known in Japan as , is a video game for the Nintendo Entertainment System released in 1988. It is the sequel to Bases Loaded and is continued by Bases Loaded 3. The game is the second installment of the Bases Loaded series. The game was novelized by Peter Lerangis, as part of the Worlds of Power series published by Scholastic Books.

Gameplay 
Like its predecessor, Bases Loaded II offers both a single-game mode and a single-
player "pennant race" mode. In the "pennant race", a player must first achieve at least a 75-55 record during the regular season, then win a best-of-7 "World Series" against L.A. or N.Y. depending whether you have chosen a team from the Eastern or Western league respectively.

Though some characteristics remained the same between Bases Loaded and Bases Loaded II (e.g. the same fictitious 12-team league returns in this game, with new players. It is worth noting that all of the players on the Washington, D.C. team are named after famous politicians, while all of Los Angeles's players take their names from Hollywood luminaries. In addition, one of Hawaii's pitchers is named Ho.), there are several noteworthy changes. One new feature was the "biorhythm" concept; players in the game had "biorhythms" that could be monitored to ensure optimal performance. Bases Loaded II had a little faster play action than the original game, and the point of view once a ball was hit into play was also different. In Bases Loaded the view was from behind home plate, whereas in Bases Loaded II the view was either from the first-base line if the home team was at bat, or from the third-base line if the visiting team was at bat.

One big improvement over the original Bases Loaded included the ability to modify the starting lineup and batting order for the user controlled team, and clearly defined pitcher's roles which were outlined clearly in the detailed rosters included with the instructional manual.

One other feature largely unique to this particular game was the concept of a mandatory called game via an unconventional "9-run rule".  Also, like in Nippon Professional Baseball, no game was allowed to last more than 12 innings.

Reception
Allgame gave Bases Loaded II four out of five stars.

References

External links

1988 video games
Bases Loaded 2: Second Season
Jaleco games
Nintendo Entertainment System games
Nintendo Entertainment System-only games
Tose (company) games
Video game sequels
Video games developed in Japan
Multiplayer and single-player video games